Larrazábal is a station on the Buenos Aires Premetro. The station is on the branch that terminates at General Savio station. It was opened on 29 April 1987 together with the other Premetro stations. The station is located in the Barrio of Villa Lugano, near a large social housing complex.

The station was formerly called Armada Argentina, but was renamed in 2003 along with several other stations.

References

Buenos Aires PreMetro stations
Buenos Aires Underground stations
Railway stations opened in 1987